Tiraios I was a king from 95/94 BC to 90/89 BC of Characene, a vassal state of the Parthians .

Like most kings of Characene he is known only from numismatic sources, in his case silver tetradrachms and bronze coins. 

His name is probably Persian in origin but his coinage indicates he was hellenised. He was the first ruler of Characene whose coins described him as "Euergetes" (Benefactor) and he is also unique in that his coins bear on the reverse the goddess Tyche, while the other rulers of Characene depicted Heracles. 

The Chinese explorer Gan Ying visited Characene during his reign.

References

Kings of Characene
1st-century BC monarchs in the Middle East
Year of birth missing
Year of death missing
1st-century BC rulers
1st-century BC deaths
Vassal rulers of the Parthian Empire